The 1926 Wimbledon Championships, also known as the Jubilee Championships, took place on the outdoor grass courts at the All England Lawn Tennis and Croquet Club in Wimbledon, London, United Kingdom. The tournament ran from 21 June until 3 July. It was the 46th staging of the Wimbledon Championships, and the third Grand Slam tennis event of 1926.

Finals

Men's singles

 Jean Borotra defeated  Howard Kinsey, 8–6, 6–1, 6–3

Women's singles

 Kitty Godfree defeated  Lilí de Álvarez, 6–2, 4–6, 6–3

Men's doubles

 Jacques Brugnon /  Henri Cochet defeated  Howard Kinsey /  Vincent Richards, 7–5, 4–6, 6–3, 6–2

Women's doubles

 Mary Browne /  Elizabeth Ryan defeated  Kitty Godfree /  Evelyn Colyer, 6–1, 6–1

Mixed doubles

 Leslie Godfree  /  Kitty Godfree defeated  Howard Kinsey /  Mary Browne, 6–3, 6–4

Notes

References

External links
 Official Wimbledon Championships website
 British Pathé filmreel (Wimbledon's Jubilee)

 
Wimbledon Championships
Wimbledon Championships
Wimbledon Championships
Wimbledon Championships